Rosa Estiarte (April 26, 1959 – April 8, 1985) was a Spanish breaststroke swimmer who competed in the 1976 Summer Olympics.

References

1959 births
1985 deaths
Spanish female breaststroke swimmers
Olympic swimmers of Spain
Swimmers at the 1976 Summer Olympics
20th-century Spanish women